Provincial Highway 72 is an expressway, which begins in Houlong, Miaoli on Guanghua Road (Provincial Highway No. 1) and ends in Shitan, Miaoli on the Provincial Highway No. 3.

Length
The total length is 28 km (17.4 mi).

Exit list
{| class="plainrowheaders wikitable"
|-
!scope=col|City
!scope=col|Location
!scope=col|km
!scope=col|Mile
!scope=col|Exit
!scope=col|Name
!scope=col|Destinations
!scope=col|Notes
|-

Major Cities Along the Route
Miaoli City

Intersections with other Freeways and Expressways
No direct connections. However, Houlong IC of National Highway No. 3 and Touwu IC. and Miaoli IC of National Highway No. 1 are close to this expressway.

See also
 Highway system in Taiwan

Notes
Tongluo IC - Shitan End completed on January 29, 2005.

There is a 2 km planned route west of the Provincial Highway No. 1. Its construction is postponed indefinitely.

A trial program to allow a motorcycle with a cylinder capacity of more than 250 cm3 or with an electric power of more than 40 horsepowers was started in January 2005 for one year. This trial program was extended for one year.

References

http://www.thb.gov.tw/

Highways in Taiwan